Clipstone Colliery Sidings railway station was a station in Clipstone, Nottinghamshire.

While primarily a goods station, there was an unadvertised halt used by workmen. It was on the former Lancashire, Derbyshire and East Coast Railway line and is listed in Butt as Clipstone Colliery Sidings.

A large concentration of sidings around Kings Clipstone and the worker's halt at New Clipstone village both served the Clipstone, Mansfield, Thoresby, Ollerton, Welbeck and Rainworth collieries for several decades.

Clipstone Sidings signalbox was existent on 21 October 1950 and was near Clipstone West Junction, heading towards Welbeck Junction.

Clipstone East signalbox was existent in the 1960s on the 'main-line' between Welbeck Junction and Thoresby Junction.

The Midland Loaded Sidings of Clipstone Colliery were still in regular use on 23 June 1972 

Both Clipstone West junction and Clipstone colliery Junction and closed on 14 July 1986.

The pit closed in April 2003.

Clipstone Sidings signalbox, Clipstone West Junction and Welbeck Junction no longer exist

References

Further reading

External links
Clipstone Siding on a navigable 1947 OS map
Clipstone Colliery
Clipstone Sidings Signalbox

Disused railway goods stations in Great Britain
Disused railway stations in Nottinghamshire
Former Lancashire, Derbyshire and East Coast Railway stations